Acer circinatum, the vine maple, is a species of maple native to western North America.

Description 
The shoots are slender and hairless.

The leaves turn bright yellow to orange-red in autumn. The flowers are small,  in diameter, with a dark red calyx and five short greenish-yellow petals; they are produced in open corymbs of 4 to 20 together in spring.

Vine maple trees can bend over easily. Sometimes, this can cause the top of the tree to grow into the ground and send out a new root system, creating a natural arch. This characteristic makes it the only maple capable of layering.

Taxonomy 
It belongs to the Palmatum group of maple trees native to East Asia with its closest relatives being the Acer japonicum (fullmoon maple) and Acer pseudosieboldianum (Korean maple). It can be difficult to distinguish from these species in cultivation. It is the only member of the Palmatum group that resides outside of Asia.

Distribution and habitat 
It can be found from southwest British Columbia to northern California, usually within  of the Pacific Ocean coast, found along the Columbia Gorge and Coastal Forest. It can found no further inland than the east side of the Cascade Range.

Ecology 
Various birds and mammals eat the seeds of this species.

Cultivation 
It is occasionally cultivated outside its native range as an ornamental tree, from Juneau, Alaska, and Ottawa, Ontario, to Huntsville, Alabama, and also in northwestern Europe.

Uses
The Quinault people used the shoots to weave baskets.

Gallery

References

External links
 

circinatum
Flora of the West Coast of the United States
Trees of British Columbia
Natural history of the California Coast Ranges
Garden plants of North America
Plants used in bonsai
Ornamental trees
Trees of the United States
Plants described in 1813